Dippu Sangma (born 20 May 1997) is an Indian cricketer. He made his List A debut for Meghalaya in the 2018–19 Vijay Hazare Trophy on 21 September 2018. He made his first-class debut for Meghalaya in the 2018–19 Ranji Trophy on 1 November 2018. He made his Twenty20 debut on 11 January 2021, for Meghalaya in the 2020–21 Syed Mushtaq Ali Trophy.

References

External links
 

1997 births
Living people
Indian cricketers
Meghalaya cricketers
Place of birth missing (living people)